Andra is a village and panchayat in Mentada mandal, Vizianagaram district of Andhra Pradesh, India.

Geography
It has an average elevation of 127 meters (419 feet).

Andra Reservoir Project
Andra Reservoir Project was constructed across River Champavathi. It is located near Andra village. It was constructed during 1983–2000. The Project utilizes 0.980 TMC of the available water and the Reservoir Storage Capacity is about 0.9 TMC. The total ayacut of  has been stabilised in Bondapalli, Gajapathinagaram and Mentada Mandals.

References

Villages in Vizianagaram district